Emanuel "Manny" Viveiros (born January 8, 1966) is a Canadian-Austrian professional ice hockey coach and former player. Vivieros is currently the head coach of the  Henderson Silver Knights of the American Hockey League. He is former head coach of the Spokane Chiefs in the Western Hockey League (WHL), an assistant coach for the Edmonton Oilers and head coach of the WHL's Swift Current Broncos.

Playing career
As a youth, Viveiros played in the 1979 Quebec International Pee-Wee Hockey Tournament with a minor ice hockey team from St. Albert, Alberta.

Viveiros played for the St. Albert Saints and the Prince Albert Raiders in the early- and mid-1980s. He was a member of the 1985 Memorial Cup-winning Raiders. 

He played 29 games in the National Hockey League for the Minnesota North Stars. He won the Calder Cup in the American Hockey League in 1991 with the Springfield Indians. The year after that he signed with the EC VSV in Austria, where he won the national championship in 1992 and 1993.

After four seasons with VSV, Viveiros moved through several teams in Austrian, Italian and German leagues, until settling in with Austrian Klagenfurter AC in 2000, winning two more national championships in 2001 and 2004. Viveiros played in parts of 7 seasons for KAC.

Viveiros also obtained Austrian citizenship and played as part of the Austrian national team in 2005.

Coaching career
He switched to coaching after retiring early into the 2006-07 season due to a back injury and took over head coaching duties at Klagenfurter AC for the 2007-08 campaign. He guided the team to a national championship as a coach in 2009 and to the finals in 2011. However, after a disappointing 2011-12 season Viveiros was removed from his position as head coach, but then was named sports director of the club.

He coached the Austrian national team for three years that included the participation at the 2014 Olympic Games. He did not have his contract renewed in April 2014.
  
In 2014, he joined the coaching staff of German team ERC Ingolstadt as an assistant, working under Larry Huras. ERC reached the finals of the Deutsche Eishockey Liga that season. Viveiros was promoted to head coach for the following campaign. He was sacked on November 14, 2015, after his team had collected only 17 points from 18 games.

Viveiros was formerly the head coach for the Swift Current Broncos of the Western Hockey League.  On May 25, 2018, he was named as an assistant coach for the Edmonton Oilers. After one season in Edmonton, he returned to the WHL as head coach of the Spokane Chiefs.

On August 31, 2020, he was brought on as head coach for the Henderson Silver Knights, the AHL affiliate of the Vegas Golden Knights.

Career statistics

Regular season and playoffs

International

Awards
 WHL East Second All-Star Team – 1984 & 1985
 WHL East First All-Star Team – 1986

References

External links

1966 births
Living people
Albany Choppers players
Austrian ice hockey players
Canadian ice hockey defencemen
Canadian people of Portuguese descent
Austrian people of Portuguese descent
EC Graz players
EC VSV players
Edmonton Oilers coaches
Edmonton Oilers draft picks
ESV Kaufbeuren players
Ice hockey people from Alberta
EC KAC players
Minnesota North Stars players
Naturalised citizens of Austria
Prince Albert Raiders players
Schwenninger Wild Wings players
Sportspeople from St. Albert, Alberta
Springfield Indians players
Swift Current Broncos coaches
Canadian expatriate ice hockey players in Austria
Canadian expatriate ice hockey players in Germany
Canadian ice hockey coaches